Public  is a quartier of Saint Barthélemy in the Caribbean. In the western part of the island, situated 180 km to the North-West of St.John's, around 90 km North-West from the St. Kitts and Nevis border. it is one of its most densely inhabited and active areas. It is north of the main centre of Gustavia and functions as its industrial zone.

Climate 
An average temperature of 27 °C throughout the year, summer season experience from December to April, and May onwards till November is the rainy season. Thunder, heavy rains and cyclone occur during this period.

Places around 
There are some places near the Public, to visit.

 Pic Paradis
 Anguilla
 Saba
 The Quill (Volcano)

References 

¢ Climate section is attributed from https://www.flycorsair.com, a public domain
¢ Places around section is attributed from www.advisor.travel.com which is a public domain.

Populated places in Saint Barthélemy
Quartiers of Saint Barthélemy